Amritpur Assembly constituency is a constituency of the Uttar Pradesh Legislative Assembly covering the city of Amritpur in the Farrukhabad district of Uttar Pradesh, India.
  
Amritpur is one of five assembly constituencies in the Farrukhabad Lok Sabha constituency. Since 2008, this assembly constituency is numbered 193 amongst 403 constituencies.

Currently this seat belongs to Bharatiya Janta Party candidate Suhil Kumar Shakya who won in last Assembly election of 2017 Uttar Pradesh Legislative Elections defeating Samajwadi Party candidate Narendra Singh Yadav by a margin of 40,507 votes.

Members of the Legislative Assembly

References

External links
 

Assembly constituencies of Uttar Pradesh
Farrukhabad district